Tephrosara is a genus of moths belonging to the family Tineidae. It contains only one species, Tephrosara cimmeria, which is endemic to New Zealand.

Description of species

The wingspan is 14–15 mm. The forewings are elongate and rather dark grey. The tips of the scales are whitish and there are two ochreous-brown longitudinal lines. The hindwings are dark 
fuscous.

References

External links

Image of type specimen of Tephrosara cimmeria.

Tineidae
Monotypic moth genera
Moths of New Zealand
Endemic fauna of New Zealand
Tineidae genera
Taxa named by Edward Meyrick
Endemic moths of New Zealand